Steve Kirk is a Scottish former professional footballer.

Steve Kirk may also refer to:

 Stephen Kirk (handballer) (born 1959), American former handball player